Hurricane Gilbert was the second most intense tropical cyclone on record in the Atlantic basin in terms of barometric pressure, only behind Hurricane Wilma in 2005. An extremely powerful tropical cyclone that formed during the 1988 Atlantic hurricane season, Gilbert peaked as a Category 5 strength hurricane that brought widespread destruction to the Caribbean and the Gulf of Mexico, and is tied with 1969's Hurricane Camille as the second-most intense tropical cyclone to make landfall in the Atlantic Ocean. Gilbert was also one of the largest tropical cyclones ever observed in the Atlantic basin. At one point, its tropical storm-force winds measured  in diameter. In addition, Gilbert was the most intense tropical cyclone in recorded history to strike Mexico.

Following intensification into a tropical storm the next day, Gilbert steadily strengthened as it tracked west-northwestward into the Caribbean Sea. On September 10, Gilbert attained hurricane intensity, and rapidly intensified into a Category 3 hurricane on September 11. Gilbert then weakened slightly, and made landfall on the Yucatán Peninsula later that day while maintaining Category 5 intensity. After landfall, Gilbert weakened rapidly over the Yucatán Peninsula, and emerged into the Gulf of Mexico as a Category 2 storm on September 15. Gradual intensification occurred as Gilbert tracked across the Gulf of Mexico, and the storm made landfall as a Category 3 hurricane in mainland Mexico on September 16. The hurricane gradually weakened after landfall, and eventually dissipated on September 19 over the Midwestern United States. On the island of Cozumel, 900 millibars were recorded when the Hurricane Gilbert made landfall as a category 5 hurricane with winds of 165 mph.

Gilbert wrought havoc in the Caribbean and the Gulf of Mexico for nearly nine days. In total, it killed 318 people and caused about $2.98 billion (1988 USD) in damages over the course of its path. As a result of the extensive damage caused by Gilbert, the World Meteorological Organization retired the name in the spring of 1989; it was replaced with Gordon for the 1994 hurricane season.

Meteorological history

The origins of Hurricane Gilbert trace back to an easterly tropical wave—an elongated low-pressure area moving from east to west—that crossed the northwestern coast of Africa on September 3, 1988. Over the subsequent days, the wave traversed the tropical Atlantic and developed a broad wind circulation extending just north of the equator. The system remained disorganized until September 8, when satellite images showed a defined circulation center approaching the Windward Islands. The depression proceeded toward the west-northwest, and while moving through the Lesser Antilles near Martinique, it gained enough strength to be designated as Tropical Storm Gilbert.

After becoming a tropical storm, Gilbert underwent a period of significant strengthening. Passing to the south of Dominican Republic and Haiti, it became a hurricane late on September 10 and further strengthened to Category 3 intensity on the Saffir–Simpson scale the next day. On September 12, the hurricane made landfall on the eastern coast of Jamaica at this intensity; its -wide eye moved from east to west across the entire length of the island.

Gilbert strengthened rapidly after emerging from the coast of Jamaica. This pressure was the lowest ever observed in the Western Hemisphere and made Gilbert the most intense Atlantic hurricane on record until it was surpassed by Hurricane Wilma in 2005.

Gilbert then weakened some, but remained a Category 5 hurricane as it made landfall for a second time on the island of Cozumel, and then a third time on Mexico's Yucatán Peninsula on September 14. This made it the first Category 5 hurricane to make landfall in the Atlantic basin since        Hurricane David hit Hispaniola in 1979. The storm weakened quickly while crossing land before it emerged into the Gulf of Mexico as a Category 2 hurricane.

On September 17, Gilbert brushed the inland city of Monterrey, Nuevo León before taking a sharp turn to the north. The storm spawned 29 tornadoes in Texas on September 18, and then moved across Oklahoma. It was absorbed by a low-pressure system over Missouri on September 19, and finally became extratropical over Lake Michigan.

Preparations

Late on September 10, a tropical storm warning was issued by the National Hurricane Center for the southern coast of the Dominican Republic alongside a hurricane watch for the Barahona Peninsula. The hurricane watch for Barahona was upgraded to a hurricane warning early on September 11. Later that day, hurricane watches were posted for the Dominican Republic's southern coast, Jamaica, and the southern coast of Cuba east of Cabo Cruz; the hurricane watch in Jamaica was upgraded to a hurricane warning by the end of the day. Hurricane warnings for the southern coast of Haiti were also posted on September 11. Cayman Airways evacuated residents from the Cayman Islands ahead of Gilbert.

On September 12, a hurricane watch was issued for the Cayman Islands, and the hurricane watch for the southern coast of Cuba was extended to Cienfuegos, with the portion of the watch east of Camagüey upgraded to a hurricane warning. That evening, the Yucatán Peninsula was placed under a hurricane watch between Felipe Carrillo Puerto and Progreso. This area included the resort cities of Cancún and Cozumel. The following day, hurricane watches were posted for Pinar del Río and Isla de la Juventud, and the Cayman Islands were placed under a hurricane warning. The watches in western Cuba and the Yucatán Peninsula were replaced with warnings at about mid-day September 13. As Gilbert approached the Yucatán Peninsula on September 14, the hurricane warning in the region was extended to cover the entire coast between Chetumal and Champotón, while a hurricane watch was posted for the northern district of Belize.

Once Gilbert entered the Gulf of Mexico on September 15, hurricane watches were posted for the portion of the shore between Port Arthur and Tampico. Around noon that day, the hurricane watch was upgraded to a hurricane warning between Tampico and Port O'Connor.

Texas governor Bill Clements issued a decree allowing municipalities to lift laws in the name of public safety, including contraflow lane reversals and speed limits.

Impact

Gilbert claimed 318 lives, mostly in Mexico. Exact monetary damage figures are not available, but the total for all areas affected by Gilbert is estimated to be near $2.98 billion (1988 USD).

Eastern Caribbean and Venezuela
As a tropical storm, Gilbert brought high winds and heavy rains to many of the eastern Caribbean islands. At Hewanorra International Airport, a dam ruptured and flooded one of the runways. Offshore, six fishermen went missing as Gilbert approached the Lesser Antilles. Banana crop losses from the storm in St. Lucia reached $740,000, with Guadeloupe, St. Vincent, and Dominica reporting similar damage. Several mudslides were reported in Dominica, though no damage resulted from them. Roughly  of rain fell in Barbados, leading to flash floods and prompting officials to close schools and government offices. The U.S. Virgin Islands experienced widespread power outages and flooding, with many residents losing electricity for several days. Damage was less severe in the nearby British Virgin Islands, where only some flooding and power outages took place. In Puerto Rico, dozens of small communities lost power and agricultural losses reached $200,000.

In Venezuela, outflow bands from Gilbert produced extreme torrential rain which triggered widespread flash floods and landslides in the northern part of the country, killing five people and leaving hundreds homeless. Damage from the storm was estimated at $3 million. A combined and confirmed death toll of seven dead from the Dominican Republic and Venezuela.

Hispaniola
Heavy rains from the outer bands of Hurricane Gilbert triggered significant flooding in the Dominican Republic and Haiti. At least nine people perished in the Dominican Republic as many rivers, including the Yuna, overtopped their banks. The main electrical relay station in Santo Domingo was damaged by the storm, causing a temporary blackout for much of the city. Losses in the country were estimated in the millions of dollars. In nearby Haiti, more substantial losses took place; 53 people died, including 10 offshore. Most of the casualties took place in the southern part of the country. The port of Jacmel was reportedly destroyed by  waves stirred up by the hurricane. In light of extensive damage, the government of Haiti declared a state of emergency for the entire southern peninsula. Losses throughout Haiti were estimated at $91.2 million.

Jamaica

Prime Minister Edward Seaga stated that the hardest hit areas near where Gilbert made landfall looked "like Hiroshima after the atom bomb." The storm left $700 million (1988 USD) in damage from destroyed crops, buildings, houses, roads, and small aircraft. Two people eventually had to be rescued because of mudslides triggered by Gilbert and were sent to the hospital. The two people were reported to be fine. No planes were going in and out of Kingston, and telephone lines were jammed from Jamaica to Florida.

As Gilbert lashed Kingston, its winds knocked down power lines, uprooted trees, and flattened fences. On the north coast,  waves hit, forcing hotels to be evacuated in the popular tourist destination. Kingston's airport reported severe damage to its aircraft, and all Jamaica-bound flights were cancelled at Miami International Airport. Unofficial estimates state that at least 30 people were killed around the island. Estimated property damage reached more than $200 million. More than 100,000 houses were destroyed or damaged and the country's banana crop was largely destroyed. Hundreds of miles of roads and highways were also heavily damaged. Reconnaissance flights over remote parts of Jamaica reported that eighty percent of the homes on the island had lost their roofs. The poultry industry was also wiped out; the damage from agricultural loss reached $500 million (1988 USD). Hurricane Gilbert was the most destructive storm in the history of Jamaica and the most severe storm since Hurricane Charlie in 1951.

Cayman Islands
However, the islands largely escaped the hurricane due to Gilbert's quick forward motion. Damage was mitigated because the depth of the water surrounding the islands limited the height of the storm surge to  There was very severe damage to crops, trees, pastures, and a number of private homes. At least 50 people were left homeless and losses were expected to be in the millions.

Central America and Mexico

Across parts of northern Central America, heavy rains from the outer bands of Hurricane Gilbert triggered deadly flash floods. Its rainfall and high winds reached Guatemala, Belize, and Honduras. In Honduras, at least eight people were killed and 6,000 were left homeless. Sixteen people perished in Guatemala and another five died in Nicaragua, leaving a total of 21 people dead in Central America.

35,000 people were left homeless and 83 ships sank when Gilbert struck the Yucatán Peninsula. 60,000 homes were destroyed, and damage was estimated at between $1 and 2 billion (1989 US$). A further loss of $87 million (1989 USD) due to a decline in tourism was estimated for the months of October, November and December in 1988.

As Gilbert lashed the third largest city of Mexico, Monterrey, it brought very high winds, torrential rains, and extensive flash floods. More than 60 people died from raging flood waters, and it was feared that more than 150 people died when five buses carrying evacuees were overturned in the raging floodwaters. Six policemen died when they were swept away while trying to rescue passengers on buses stranded by the Santa Catarina River. The residents of Monterrey had no power or drinking water, and most telephone lines were down. As the water receded, vehicles began appearing with their wheels up, jammed with mud and rocks. Quintana Roo Governor Miguel Borge reported that damages in Cancún were estimated at more than 1.3 billion Mexican pesos (1988 pesos; $500 million in USD). More than 5,000 American tourists were evacuated from Cancún. In Saltillo, five people died in road accidents caused by heavy rain, and almost 1,000 were left homeless. In Coahuila, rainfall from Gilbert caused the deaths of 5 people who were swept away by rising waters. Among these were a paramedic and a pregnant woman who died when a Mexican Red Cross ambulance fell into a flooded arroyo near Los Chorros after a bridge collapsed. Gilbert dumped torrential rains and spawned some tornadoes. In Quintana Roo, Gilbert caused significant defoliation in the jungle. The debris eventually fueled a fire in 1989, which ultimately burned .

United States

Despite concerns that Texas might suffer a direct hit, there was only minor damage reported in southern Texas from Gilbert's landfall  to the south. Winds gusted to hurricane force in a few places, but the main impact felt in the state was from beach erosion caused by a 3-5-foot storm surge, and tornadoes, which mainly affected the San Antonio area. 29 tornadoes were spawned by Gilbert in Texas, at least two of which were killer tornadoes. Estimates ranged from 30 to more than 60 hitting 25 Texas counties. Nine of them hit San Antonio, where a 59-year-old woman was killed as she slept in her mobile home. 40 tornadoes were spawned in an area from Corpus Christi and Brownsville north to San Antonio and west to Del Rio. Gilbert also provided a good look at a particular unusual hurricane-spawned tornado in Del Rio, two hundred and fifty miles from the ocean. It was the first of this type of tornado to be captured on film since a tornado spun from Hurricane Agnes in 1972. Despite the massive appearance of the tornado, it did not produce a wide range damage path. Few hurricane-spawned tornadoes do. In the state, a major disaster was declared on October 5, 1988.

Overall damage in the United States was estimated at $80 million (1988 USD).

Aftermath, retirement, and records

The overall property damage was estimated at $2.98 billion (1988 USD). Earlier estimates put property damage from Gilbert at $2.5 billion but were as high as $10 billion. A final count of Hurricane Gilbert's victims is not possible because many people remained missing in Mexico, but the total confirmed death toll was 433 people. Gilbert was the worst hurricane in the history of Jamaica and the most destructive tropical cyclone on record to strike Mexico. Due to its widespread impact, extensive damage, and extreme loss of life, the name Gilbert was retired in the spring of 1989 by the World Meteorological Organization and was the first name to be retired since Hurricane Gloria in 1985. The name will never again be used for another Atlantic hurricane. The name was replaced by Gordon during the 1994 Atlantic hurricane season.

The destruction in Jamaica was so heavy that Lovindeer, one of the country's leading dance hall DJs, released a single called Wild Gilbert a few days after the storm. It was the fastest selling reggae record in the history of Jamaican music. In 1989, the PBS series Nova released the episode "Hurricane!" that featured Gilbert (later modified in 1992 to reflect Hurricane Andrew and Hurricane Iniki). 

On September 13, Hurricane Gilbert attained a record low central pressure of 888 mb (hPa; 26.22 inHg), surpassing the previous minimum of  set by the 1935 Labor Day hurricane. This made it the strongest tropical cyclone on record in the north Atlantic basin at the time. Gilbert is the most intense tropical cyclone on record to strike Jamaica. This ranked it as the fourth-wettest known storm to strike Jamaica; however, it has since been surpassed by three other storms.

See also

 List of Atlantic hurricanes
 List of Atlantic hurricane records
 List of Category 5 Atlantic hurricanes
 Hurricane Debby (1988) – A Category 1 hurricane that impacted Eastern Mexico
 Hurricane Diana (1990) – A Category 2 hurricane that devastated Eastern Mexico

Notes

References

1988 Atlantic hurricane season
Category 5 Atlantic hurricanes
Retired Atlantic hurricanes
Hurricanes in the Leeward Islands
Hurricanes in the Windward Islands
Hurricanes in Puerto Rico
Hurricanes in the Dominican Republic
Hurricanes in Haiti
Hurricanes in Dominica
Hurricanes in Martinique
Hurricanes in Jamaica
1988 natural disasters
1988 in Jamaica
1988 in the Caribbean
1988 in Mexico
1988 natural disasters in the United States
1988 meteorology
Gilbert
Hurricanes in Coahuila
Hurricanes in Quintana Roo
Hurricanes in Tamaulipas
Hurricanes in Yucatán
Hurricanes in Belize